Claridge is an unincorporated community in Westmoreland County, Pennsylvania, United States. Claridge has a post office with ZIP code 15623, which opened on January 25, 1886.

References

Unincorporated communities in Westmoreland County, Pennsylvania
Unincorporated communities in Pennsylvania